Thomas William Schnackenberg   (born 11 May 1945) is a New Zealand sailor and yacht designer best known for his involvement with the America's Cup. He was inducted into the America's Cup Hall of Fame in 2000.

Schnackenberg attended Auckland Grammar School before gaining a masters in physics from the University of Auckland and enrolling for a Ph.D. at the University of British Columbia.

Having served in the Auckland Grammar School Sea Cadets, Schnackenberg joined the RNZNVR, later acquiring a commission as a Reserve officer at HMNZS Ngapona.

Schnackenberg joined North Sails in 1974, and was first involved with the 1977 America's Cup as a sailmaker for US-27 "Enterprise", skippered by Lowell North.

He returned to NZ in 1978 to start a branch of North Sails there.

He designed a number of sails for Australia in the 1980 America's Cup before being promoted to sail co-ordinator for Australia II in the 1983 America's Cup. Australia II won the cup, becoming the first team to defeat the New York Yacht Club. Schnackenberg was again the sail co-ordinator for Australia III and Australia IV's unsuccessful defence of the America's Cup in 1987 before joining New Zealand Challenge to help design KZ1 for the 1988 America's Cup. He was a part of the Spirit of Australia challenge in the 1992 Louis Vuitton Cup before joining Team New Zealand as the design co-ordinator and navigator for their victory at the 1995 America's Cup. 1995 was his first on-board role at an America's Cup. During this period, he also coached the New Zealand yachting team for the Olympic Games in 1992, 1996 and 2000.

He remained with Team New Zealand for their defence at the 2000 America's Cup and was promoted to syndicate head for the unsuccessful 2003 America's Cup defence, where he helped in the design of NZL 82. 

He remained with the team through 2004 and then joined Luna Rossa challenge for the 2007 America's Cup, working as a performance data analyst. 

He worked for Americas Cup Management  and was part of the Alinghi team in their 2010 catamaran defence, and then joined Artemis Racing in the lead up to the 2013 America's Cup as a data analyst

Schnackenberg received an honorary Medal of the Order of Australia, for service as sail co-ordinator for the successful 1983 America's Cup challenge, in the 1984 Australia Day Honours. In the 1995 New Zealand Queen's Birthday Honours, he was appointed an Officer of the Order of the British Empire, for services to yachting, and in 2001 he was awarded an honorary Doctor of Engineering by the University of Auckland,  and an honorary Doctor of Laws by the University of British Columbia.

References

1945 births
New Zealand male sailors (sport)
New Zealand Officers of the Order of the British Empire
Honorary Recipients of the Medal of the Order of Australia
Team New Zealand sailors
People educated at Auckland Grammar School
University of British Columbia Faculty of Science alumni
University of Auckland alumni
Living people
2003 America's Cup sailors
2000 America's Cup sailors
1995 America's Cup sailors
New Zealand yacht designers
America's Cup yacht designers
Artemis Racing sailors
1988 America's Cup sailors